Caroline L. Freund is an American economist who is currently the dean of University of California San Diego’s School of Global Policy and Strategy (GPS). She was Director of Trade, Regional Integration and Investment Climate at the World Bank and a Senior Fellow at the Peterson Institute for International Economics since 2013, a position from which she is on leave.

Education and work 
Freund graduated from Bowdoin College with a Bachelor of Arts in Mathematics and Economics in 1988. She received her Ph.D. in Economics from Columbia University in 1997. Freund is a student of Jagdish Bhagwati at Columbia University. Prior to receiving her doctorate, she joined the Peace Corps in Ghana for two years, teaching math in a village school near the town of Kumasi.

Besides her fellowship with the Peterson Institute for International Economics and recent position with the World Bank, Freund has served in three previous roles with the World Bank: Chief Economist for the Middle East and North Africa from 2011 to 2013, and Senior and Lead Economist in the Development Research Group for International Trade from 2002 to 2009 and 2009 to 2011, respectively. She has also held posts with the International Monetary Fund and the Board of Governors of the Federal Reserve System.

Freund has been on boards and committees, such as the Advisory Board of the Export–Import Bank of the United States, the Scientific Committees of the CEPII and Economic Research Forum, and the Centre for Economic Policy Research.

Director, World Development Report 2020 
Freund co-directed the World Bank's 2020 publication on trade through global value chains (GVCs).

Dean, School of Global Policy and Strategy 
Freund has been appointed the next dean of the University of California San Diego’s School of Global Policy and Strategy (GPS), effective July 1, 2021.

Research and publications 
Freund's research primarily focuses on trade and economic growth.

Research on trade 
Regarding trade, Freund has published on regionalism as well as other areas of trade.

Research on regionalism 
In 2008, together with Antoni Estevadeordal and Emanuel Ornelas, she wrote a paper (titled "Does Regionalism Affect Trade Liberalization Towards Non-Members") looking into the effects of regionalism on unilateral trade liberalization (a country's removal of their own trade barriers and restrictions) using data for ten Latin American countries from 1990 to 2001. The paper finds that although preferential tariffs (import tariffs that are lower for countries involved in a bilateral trade agreement than for countries not a part of the agreement) for a sector and that sector's common external tariff are positively related, this relationship does not appear in customs unions, in which a common external tariff must exist. As such, Freund and her co-authors conclude that claims asserting that preferential tariff liberalization has a negative effect on external tariff liberalization are not legitimate.

In 2009, together with Emanuel Ornelas, she published a literature review (titled "Regional Trade Agreements") of theoretical and empirical research on regional trade agreements (RTA), which had been the most widespread form of trade liberalization since the mid-1990s. The review discusses three issues related to RTAs from both a theoretical and empirical lens: an increase in trade diversion because of government lobbying by groups to create trade agreements with significant distortion, a slowdown or contraction of external trade liberalization, and a weakening of a multilateralism approach. Freund and her co-author find that from a theoretical standpoint, all three issues are justifiable. However, from an empirical standpoint, they find that neither an increase in trade diversion nor a slowdown in external liberalization can be seen, and a weakening of multilateralism has yet to be properly measured.

In 2010, together with Emanuel Ornelas, she wrote a paper (titled "Regional trade agreements: blessing or burden") examining the strengths and weaknesses of RTAs, which as noted above had seen a surge in popularity since the early 1990s. Freund and her co-author note that RTAs generally lead to trade creation, but can also lead to trade diversion on occasion, albeit in low amounts. They conclude that, with consideration to current empirical data, RTAs appear to be more of a blessing than a burden.

In 2019, Dr Freund guided the World Bank publication on transport corridors due to China's Belt and Road Initiative.

Research on other areas of trade 
In 2000, together with Diana Weinhold, she wrote a paper (titled "On the effect of the Internet on international trade") concerning the impact of the Internet (measured by the number of web hosts in a country) on international trade, utilizing a gravity model of trade on 56 countries. They find that in the years 1995 and 1996, there was no evidence and weak evidence, respectively, of the Internet stimulating trade. In 1998 and 1999, however, they do find significant evidence, specifically that a 10% increase in the number of web hosts in a country would have led to an approximate 1% increase in trade. The paper also concludes that the impact of the Internet on international trade is more pronounced for poor countries than for rich countries, and that the Internet has had an insignificant effect in decreasing the impact of distance on trade.

In 2004, together with Matias Berthelon, she published a paper (titled "On the conservation of distance in international trade") about the increase in the effect of distance on international trade (as dictated by the gravity model of trade), despite trade volume having grown more than twice as fast as real income since 1980. Two possible explanations for this observation are: countries are trading a greater quantity of goods that are sensitive to distance, and that distance has become more vital for a larger proportion of traded goods. In their research, Freund and Berthelon find that trade's increased dependence on distance is due to changing relative trade costs across a country's industries. They also find that differentiated goods are half as likely to have turned more distance-sensitive than non-differentiated goods.

In 2006, together with Simeon Djankov and Cong S. Pham, she wrote a paper (titled "Trading on time") on how time delays affect international trade, specifically looking at World Bank data on the time it takes to move cargo from factory to ship in 126 countries. Controlling for endogeneity and remoteness, they find that, on average, each additional day of delay is the same as a country increasing its distance from its trading partners by 70 kilometres. Additionally, they find that delays are even more damaging to a developing country's exports.

Research on economic growth 
In 2016, together with Sarah Oliver, she published a paper (titled "The Origins of the Superrich: The Billionaire Characteristics Database") that provides a new dataset on the characteristics of the very wealthy and how those characteristics differ across first-world nations and have changed over time. The dataset classifies the billionaire as either inherited or self-made, and further classifies the self-made billionaires as company founders, executives, politically-connected, or in finance. It also identifies the company and industry from which the billionaire's wealth comes. Freund and Oliver's analysis shows that over half of European billionaires are inheritors, while only a third of American billionaires are, and that the median age of European billionaires' companies are almost 20 years older than American billionaires'. Their analysis also demonstrates that Europe's increase in wealth can be attributed to growth in traditional sectors, while the US's wealth increase is the result of growth in the finance and technology sectors. Lastly, they find evidence that the number of billionaires is increasing at a higher rate in the US than in Europe, and that American billionaires are becoming more wealthy over time than European billionaires.

In 2017, together with Dario Sidhu, she wrote a paper (titled "Manufacturing and the 2016 Election: An Analysis of US Presidential Election Data") investigating how voting patterns from the 2016 presidential election were affected by manufacturing jobs and manufacturing job loss, using county-level voting data. Controlling for other voting factors, Freund and Sidhu find that the effect of employment and job loss in the manufacturing sector on changes in Republican votes from 2012 to 2016 is not statistically significant. They do find, however, that changes in Republican votes between those elections and manufacturing are positively associated in counties that are predominantly white, and negatively associated in counties that have racial diversity.

In 2019, together with Chad P. Brown, she published a paper (titled "The Problem of US Labor Force Participation") that looks into the US's decrease in labour force participation (people of working age who are either employed or seeking employment) from 1995 to 2017. For men, they find that this decrease is due to a combination of structural-based rationale and disability. For women, they find that disability is an even stronger cause, estimating that almost two-thirds of the decline can be attributed to disability. The authors also note that other countries have experienced increases in unemployment rather than decreases in labour force participation like the US has.

Other publications 
At the Peterson Institute for International Economics, Freund published a book (titled "Rich People Poor Countries: The Rise of Emerging-Market Tycoons and their Mega Firms") with the assistance of Sarah Oliver in 2016. In the book, Freund analyzes 700 emerging-market billionaires and finds that these wealthy figures are transitioning poor countries from their current agriculture-based economies to a world of multinational industries, thus playing a role in the industrialization of the modern economic climate.

Freund has also published editorials for news outlets such as Bloomberg Opinion (formerly known as Bloomberg View) and The Washington Post.

Awards and honours 

 In top 5% of authors and top 100 female authors (RePec)
 1996: The Energy Journal, Award for Best Paper
 1992–1996: Columbia University, President's Fellow
 1993: Ford Foundation, Travel Grant Recipient, for research in Guatemala

Selected works 
 Caroline Freund, 2000. "Different Paths to Free Trade: The Gains from Regionalism," The Quarterly Journal of Economics, Oxford University Press, vol. 115(4), pages 1317-1341.
 Caroline L. Freund & Diana Weinhold, 2000. "On the effect of the Internet on international trade,"International Finance Discussion Papers 693, Board of Governors of the Federal Reserve System (U.S.).
 Djankov, Simeon & Freund, Caroline, 2002. "Trade Flows in the Former Soviet Union, 1987 to 1996," Journal of Comparative Economics, Elsevier, vol. 30(1), pages 76-90, March.
 Berthelon, Matias & Freund, Caroline, 2004. "On the conservation of distance in international trade,"Policy Research Working Paper Series 3293, The World Bank.
 Djankov, Simeon & Freund, Caroline & Pham, Cong S., 2006. "Trading on time," Policy Research Working Paper Series 3909, The World Bank.
 Antoni Estevadeordal & Caroline Freund & Emanuel Ornelas, 2008. "Does Regionalism Affect Trade Liberalization Towards Non-Members?," CEP Discussion Papers dp0868, Centre for Economic Performance, LSE.
 Caroline Freund & Emanuel Ornelas, 2009. "Regional Trade Agreements," CEP Discussion Papers dp0961, Centre for Economic Performance, LSE.
 Caroline Freund & Emanuel Ornelas, 2010. "Regional trade agreements: blessing or burden?,"CentrePiece – The Magazine for Economic Performance 313, Centre for Economic Performance, LSE.
 Freund, Caroline & Pierola, Martha Denisse, 2012. "Export surges," Journal of Development Economics, Elsevier, vol. 97(2), pages 387-395.
 Freund, Caroline & Rijkers, Bob, 2014. "Episodes of unemployment reduction in rich, middle-income and transition economies," Journal of Comparative Economics, Elsevier, vol. 42(4), pages 907-923.
 Caroline Freund & Martha Denisse Pierola, 2015. "Export Superstars," The Review of Economics and Statistics, MIT Press, vol. 97(5), pages 1023-1032, December.
 Caroline Freund & Sarah Oliver, 2016. "The Origins of the Superrich: The Billionaire Characteristics Database," Working Paper Series WP16-1, Peterson Institute for International Economics.
 Fernandes, Ana M. & Freund, Caroline & Pierola, Martha Denisse, 2016. "Exporter behavior, country size and stage of development: Evidence from the exporter dynamics database," Journal of Development Economics, Elsevier, vol. 119(C), pages 121-137.
 Caroline Freund & Dario Sidhu, 2017. "Manufacturing and the 2016 Election: An Analysis of US Presidential Election Data," Working Paper Series WP17-7, Peterson Institute for International Economics.
 Rijkers, Bob & Freund, Caroline & Nucifora, Antonio, 2017. "All in the family: State capture in Tunisia," Journal of Development Economics, Elsevier, vol. 124(C), pages 41-59.
 Caroline Freund, 2018. "Global Imbalances and the Trade Slowdown," Working Paper Series WP18-2, Peterson Institute for International Economics.
 Chad P. Bown & Caroline Freund, 2019. "The Problem of US Labor Force Participation," Working Paper Series WP19-1, Peterson Institute for International Economics.
 Caroline Freund & Mulabdic, Alen & Ruta, Michele. 2019. Is 3D Printing a Threat to Global Trade? The Trade Effects You Didn't Hear About. Policy Research Working Paper No. 9024. World Bank, Washington, DC

References 

American economists
Living people
Columbia Graduate School of Arts and Sciences alumni
Year of birth missing (living people)
Bowdoin College alumni
University of California, San Diego faculty
World Bank Group people